The Great Race is a 1965 American Technicolor slapstick comedy film starring Jack Lemmon, Tony Curtis, and Natalie Wood, directed by Blake Edwards, written by Arthur A. Ross (from a story by Edwards and Ross), and with music by Henry Mancini and cinematography by Russell Harlan. The supporting cast includes Peter Falk, Keenan Wynn, Arthur O'Connell and Vivian Vance. The movie cost US$12 million (equivalent to $98.36 million in 2020), making it the most expensive comedy film at the time. The story was inspired by the actual 1908 New York to Paris Race.

It is known for one scene that was promoted as "the greatest pie fight ever". It was nominated for five Academy Awards, winning the Academy Award for Best Sound Editing.

Plot
The Great Leslie and Professor Fate are competing daredevils at the turn of the 20th century. Leslie is the classic hero archetype – always dressed in white, handsome, ever-courteous, enormously talented and successful. Leslie's nemesis, Fate, is the traditional melodramatic villain – usually dressed in black, sporting a black moustache and top hat, glowering at almost everyone, possessing a maniacal evil laugh, filled with grandiose plans to thwart the hero, and dogged by failure. Leslie proposes an automobile race from New York City to Paris and offers the Webber Motor Car Company the opportunity to build an automobile to make the journey.  They design and build a new car for him, "The Leslie Special". Fate builds his own car, "The Hannibal Twin-8", complete with hidden devices of sabotage. Other car owners enter the race, including one owned by New York City's most prominent newspaper. Driving the newspaper's car is beautiful photojournalist Maggie DuBois, a vocal suffragist.

A seven-car race begins, but Fate's long-suffering sidekick Maximilian Meen has sabotaged four other cars (and his own, by mistake), leaving just three cars in the race. The surviving teams are Leslie with his loyal valet Hezekiah Sturdy, Maggie DuBois driving a Stanley Steamer by herself, and Fate and Max. The steamer car breaks down and Maggie accepts a lift in the Leslie Special. Fate arrives first at a refueling point, the small Western frontier town of Boracho. A local outlaw named "Texas Jack" becomes jealous of the attraction to Leslie shown by showgirl Lily Olay and a saloon brawl ensues. Fate sneaks outside amidst the chaos, steals the fuel he needs, and destroys the rest. Leslie uses mules to pull his car to another refueling point, where Maggie tricks Hezekiah into boarding a train and handcuffs him to a seat, lying to Leslie that Hezekiah had quit and "wanted to go back to New York".

The two remaining cars reach the Bering Strait and park side by side in a blinding snowstorm. Keeping warm during the storm, Leslie and Maggie begin to see each other as more than competitors. Mishaps, including a polar bear in Fate's car, compel all four racers to warm themselves in Leslie's car. They awaken on a small ice floe which drifts into their intended Russian port, where Hezekiah is waiting for Leslie, who in turn casts off Maggie for deceiving him. Maggie is snatched by Fate, who drives off in the lead.

After driving across Asia, both cars enter the tiny kingdom of Carpania, whose alcoholic and foppish Crown Prince Friedrich Hapnick is the spitting image of Professor Fate. Plotters under the leadership of Baron Rolfe von Stuppe and General Kuhster kidnap the Prince, Fate, Max, and Maggie. Max escapes and joins Leslie to rescue the others. Fate is forced to masquerade as the Prince during the coronation so that the rebels can gain control of the kingdom. Leslie and Max overcome Von Stuppe's henchmen and confront Von Stuppe.  Following a climactic sword fight with Leslie, Von Stuppe attempts escape by leaping to a waiting boat, but bursts the hull and sinks it. Leslie and Max return the real Prince to the capital in time to defeat Kuhster's plan for a military coup. Fate, still masquerading as Prince Hapnick, takes refuge in a bakery but falls into a huge cake.  A pie fight ensues involving the racers, the Prince's men and the conspirators. The five racers, covered in pie filling, depart Carpania with King Friedrich's best wishes.

As the racers leave Pottsdorf (with Maggie now back in Leslie's car), it becomes a straight road race to Paris. Nearing Paris, Leslie and Maggie have a spirited argument regarding the roles of men, women and sex in relationships. Leslie stops his car just short of the finish line under the Eiffel Tower to prove that he loves Maggie more than he cares about winning the race. Fate drives past to claim the winner's mantle, but becomes indignant that Leslie let him win. Fate demands a rematch: a race back to New York.

The return race commences, with newlyweds Leslie and Maggie now a team. Fate lets them start first, then attempts to destroy their car with a small cannon. The shot misses the Leslie Special, instead knocking down the Eiffel Tower.

Cast

 Jack Lemmon as Professor Fate and Prince Friedrich Hapnick
 Tony Curtis as The Great Leslie
 Natalie Wood as Maggie DuBois
 Peter Falk as Maximillian Mean ("Max")
 Keenan Wynn as Hezekiah Sturdy
 Arthur O'Connell as Henry Goodbody
 Vivian Vance as Hester Goodbody
 Dorothy Provine as Lily Olay
 Larry Storch as Texas Jack
 Ross Martin as Baron Rolf von Stuppe
 Hal Smith as the Mayor of Boracho
 Denver Pyle as the Sheriff of Boracho
 Marvin Kaplan as Frisbee
 George Macready as General Kuhster
 Joyce Nizzari as Woman in West
 Ken Wales as Baron's Guard
 William Bryant as Baron's Guard

Themes
Director Blake Edwards based the film on the 1908 New York to Paris Race, very loosely interpreted. On February 12, 1908, the "Greatest Auto Race" began with six entrants, starting in New York City and racing westward across three continents. The destination was Paris, making it the first around-the-world automobile race. Only the approximate race route and the general time period were borrowed by Edwards in his effort to make "the funniest comedy ever".

Edwards, a studious admirer of silent film, dedicated the film to film comedians Laurel and Hardy. The Great Race incorporated a great many silent era visual gags, along with slapstick, double entendres, parodies, and absurdities. The film includes such time-worn scenes as a barroom brawl, the tent of the desert sheik, a sword fight, and the laboratory of the mad scientist. The unintended consequences of Professor Fate's order,"Push the button, Max!" is a running gag, along with the spotless invulnerability of The Great Leslie.

Edwards poked fun at later films and literature as well. The saloon brawl scene was a parody of the western film genre, and a plot detour launched during the final third of the film was a direct parody of the novel The Prisoner of Zenda and of the 1937 film version of the story, where a traveler is a lookalike for the king and stands in for him.

Production
Because of the success of Edwards' previous films Breakfast at Tiffany's, The Pink Panther and A Shot in the Dark, the film's budget started at $6 million. Mirisch Productions initially financed the film for United Artists. The film's escalating costs led UA to drop the film, but the project was picked up by Warner Brothers.

Edwards wanted Robert Wagner to play the leading man, but studio executive Jack L. Warner insisted on Tony Curtis, possibly because of Wood's recent divorce from Wagner. (Burt Lancaster was announced at one stage.) Working with Warner, Curtis's new agent Irving "Swifty" Lazar negotiated US$125,000 for Curtis, more than Edwards and Lemmon who were to receive US$100,000 each. After Warner signed the Curtis contract, Lazar reasoned that Edwards and Lemmon should  make US$125,000, and Warner upped its compensation to match Curtis.

Natalie Wood did not want to make The Great Race, but Warner talked her into it. Wood was unhappy with her career and her personal life, having been divorced from Robert Wagner in April 1962. Warner asked Curtis if he would give a percentage of his film royalties to Wood as an enticement, but Curtis refused. He said "I couldn't give her anything to make her want to do the movie." Instead of more money, Warner promised Wood that if she completed The Great Race, she could star in Gavin Lambert's drama Inside Daisy Clover, a role she greatly wished to have. Wood agreed, thinking that filming would be brief on Edwards' movie.

Shooting began on June 15, 1964. Many of the sight gags for The Great Race were expensive to create, and the costs ballooned to US$12 million by the time the film was finished. Edwards, sometimes with Wood in tow, repeatedly visited Warner in his office to ask for more money. Warner approved nearly all of the requests. When it was released, it was the most expensive comedy ever filmed.

Shooting ended in November 1964. During the five months of filming, Wood's unhappiness was not visible to the cast and crew, and her characterization of Maggie DuBois was playful. Her sister Lana Wood thought that Wood looked the prettiest she ever had, but Lana sensed that the film "was physically taxing" for Wood. On Friday, November 27, the day after Thanksgiving, Wood wrapped the last bit of dialog work, then went home and swallowed a bottle of prescription pills. Groggy from the drugs, she called her friend Mart Crowley who took her to the hospital for emergency treatment.

Music for the film was by Henry Mancini, and the costumes were designed by Edith Head. Production design, setting the period and augmenting the visual humor, was by Fernando Carrere who had designed The Great Escape and The Pink Panther for Blake Edwards. The unique slideshow-style title design was by Ken Mundie.

Custom cars

The hero's white car, the Leslie Special, was built by Warner Brothers to resemble a Thomas Flyer, the car that won the 1908 New York to Paris Race. According to the Petersen Automotive Museum, four "Leslie Specials" were built. One of the four is at the Tupelo Automobile Museum in Tupelo, Mississippi, listed as a 1963 Leslie Special Convertible.

Another of the four appears painted dark green in the 1970 Warner Brothers film The Ballad of Cable Hogue—the grille can be seen bearing the words Leslie Special, with the wheels and tires remaining their original white color. This vehicle shows up during the last 30 minutes of the movie carrying a lead character, and has a pivotal role at the end of the movie.

The villain's black car was named the Hannibal Twin-8; five were constructed. One is on display at the Petersen Automobile Museum, powered by a Volkswagen industrial engine. Another is at the Volo Auto Museum in Volo, Illinois. This model includes a prop "cannon" and a working smoke generator. The Volo museum describes the Hannibal Twin-8 as built by Warner Brothers at a cost of US$150,000 ($ in  dollars ), powered by a Corvair six-cylinder engine with three-speed manual transmission and six wheels. All four rear wheels are powered by a chain drive.

Both vehicles were first on display at Movie World's Cars of the Stars museum in Buena Park, California until the museum closed in the late 1970s. It was located adjacent to the Planes of Fame Museum.

Pie fight
The Technicolor scene for the pie fight in the royal bakery was filmed over five days. The first pastry thrown was part of a large cake decorated for the king's coronation. Following this was the throwing of 4,000 pies, the most pies ever filmed in a pie fight. The scene lasts four minutes and 20 seconds and cost US$200,000 ($ in  dollars ) to shoot; US$18,000 ($ in  dollars ) just for the pastry.

Colorful cream pies with fillings such as raspberry, strawberry, blueberry and lemon were used. For continuity between days of shooting, the actors were photographed at the end of each day and then made up the following morning to have the same colorful appearance, the same smears of pie crust and filling.

Edwards told the cast that a pie fight by itself is not funny, so to make it funny they would build tension by having the hero, dressed all in white, fail to get hit with any pies. He said "The audience will start yearning for him to get it". Finally, the hero was to take a pie in the face at "just the right moment".

Shooting was halted while the actors took the weekend off. Over the weekend, the pie residue spoiled all over the scenery. When the actors returned Monday morning, the set stank so badly that the building required a thorough cleaning and large fans to blow out the sour air. The missing pie residue was recreated carefully with more pies, and shooting resumed.

At first, the actors had fun with the pie fight assignment, but eventually the process grew wearisome and dangerous. Wood choked briefly on pie filling which hit her open mouth. Lemmon exaggerated that he got knocked out a few times; he said "a pie hitting you in the face feels like a ton of cement". At the end of shooting, when Edwards called "cut!", he was barraged with several hundred pies that members of the cast had hidden, waiting for the moment.

The pie fight scene paid homage to the early Mack Sennett practice of using a single thrown pie as comedic punctuation, but to a greater degree, it was a celebration of movie pie fights such as Behind the Screen (1916) with Charlie Chaplin; The Battle of the Century (1927) starring Stan Laurel and Oliver Hardy; and In the Sweet Pie and Pie (1941) with the Three Stooges. In his script for The Great Race, Edwards called for a "Battle of the Century–style pie fight". Although Edwards used 4,000 pies over five days, many of these were used as set dressing for continuity. Laurel and Hardy used 3,000 pies in only one day of shooting, so more are seen flying through the air. Leonard Maltin compared The Great Race pie fight to The Battle of the Century and determined that Laurel and Hardy's pacing was far superior, that the more modern film suffered from an "incomplete understanding of slapstick" while the 1927 pie fight remains "one of the great scenes in all of screen comedy."

Reception
The Great Race was generally not well-received upon release and was considered a critical and commercial flop, making it the first notable failure for director Edwards. Most critics attacked its blatant and overdone slapstick humor and its lack of substance. It also suffered from comparisons with another race-themed "epic comedy" of 1965, Those Magnificent Men in Their Flying Machines. Film critic Richard Schickel wrote that, although the film "bumps along very pleasantly for the most part", Edwards failed at his attempt to recreate the slapstick atmosphere of a Laurel and Hardy comedy. Schickel felt that Wood was "hopelessly miscast", and that the energies of Lemmon and Curtis did not quite make the slapstick work. Maltin wrote that Wood "never looked better" and that the film's comedy sometimes worked but was otherwise forced: "a mixed bag". On review aggregator Rotten Tomatoes, the film has an approval rating of 72% based on 25 reviews, with an average score of 6.00/10.

Despite earning theatrical rentals of over $11.4 million in the United States and Canada, due to its high cost, it caused a loss to the studio.

Awards and nominations

Soundtrack
Before the film was released, the soundtrack was re-recorded in Hollywood by RCA Victor Records for release on vinyl LP. Henry Mancini spent six weeks composing the score, and the recording involved some 80 musicians. Mancini collaborated with lyricist Johnny Mercer on several songs including "The Sweetheart Tree", a waltz released as a single. The song plays on along the film as the main theme without chorus (except in the entr' acte) and it was performed onscreen by Natalie Wood with the voice dubbed by Jackie Ward (uncredited). It was nominated for but did not win an Oscar for best song. The full track listing is:

 "He Shouldn't-A, Hadn't-A, Oughtn't-A Swang on Me" – Mancini/Mercer
 Performed by Dorothy Provine
 "Buffalo Gals" – Traditional Western song performed by the chorus girls in Boracho saloon, with different lyrics and a middle section, for a 1900s atmosphere
 "The Sweetheart Tree" (chorus) – Mancini
 "The Royal Waltz" – Mancini
 "Great Race March" – Mancini
 "They're Off!" – Mancini
 "Push the Button, Max!" (Professor Fate's theme) – Mancini
 "The Great Race March" – Mancini
 "Cold Finger" – Mancini
 "Music to Become King By" – Mancini
 "Night, Night, Sweet Prince" – Mancini
 "The Pie in the Face Polka" – Mancini
 "The Desert Song"
 Music by Sigmund Romberg
"It Looks Like a Big Night Tonight"
Music by Egbert Van Alstyne
 "Big Night Tonight"
 "Toccata and Fugue in D minor, BWV 565"
 Written by Johann Sebastian Bach
 "Tales from the Vienna Woods"
 Written by Johann Strauss
 "The Beautiful Blue Danube"
 Written by Johann Strauss

Adaptations
Slightly in advance of the film's release, as was the custom of the era, a paperback novelization of the film was published by Dell Books. The author was renowned crime and western novelist Marvin H. Albert, who also made something of a cottage industry out of movie tie-ins. He seems to have been the most prolific screenplay novelizer of the late '50s through mid '60s, and, during that time, the preeminent specialist at light comedy.

The novelization, based on the screenplay rather than the finished film, differs from the film in various aspects. In the novel, the country of Carpania is called Ruritania (like in Hope's Prisoner of Zenda), Keenan Wynn's character is called Jebediah (not Hezekiah) and stays behind in Ruritania, having fallen in love with a local noblewoman. The pie fight is missing, and the drivers are chased by cowboys (rather than native Americans) before arriving in Boracho. A few minor changes concern Leslie's courting of Maggie Dubois: in the novelization, it's she who suggests sharing the blanket in the snowstorm, and she also gets to drive the Leslie Special when Leslie has his arm in a sling. Scenes not included in the film include: a rainstorm, Fate's car sinking in a river, and a more extended stay in Russia (mirroring the Boracho episode).

 Dell Movie Classic: The Great Race (March 1966)

Legacy
The film was a major influence on Wacky Races, a Hanna-Barbera cartoon series. The film's characterizations were rather cartoonish. Furthermore, film editor and sound-effects man Treg Brown, who worked on many classic Warner Brothers cartoons, worked on this film. Brown's sound design won the film an Oscar. In his Top 10 Favorite Comedies, Doug Walker cited Jack Lemmon's performance as Professor Fate as a major influence for his Nostalgia Critic persona.

See also
 Monte Carlo or Bust!, aka Those Daring Young Men in Their Jaunty Jalopies (1969)

Notes

References

External links

 
 
 
 

1965 films
1960s screwball comedy films
1960s English-language films
American adventure comedy films
American romantic comedy films
American screwball comedy films
American auto racing films
Films set in Europe
Films set in a fictional country
Films set in the 1900s
Films directed by Blake Edwards
Films with screenplays by Blake Edwards
American comedy road movies
American slapstick comedy films
Warner Bros. films
Films that won the Best Sound Editing Academy Award
Films scored by Henry Mancini
Films adapted into comics
1965 comedy films
1960s American films